Sauzé-Vaussais is a commune in the Deux-Sèvres department in western France. The surrounding area is strongly agricultural, with many business relating to agriculture and wood / forestry management. The weekly market is popular, with a range of stalls selling local produce. The market is visited by English stallholders, serving the local expat population.

The residents shorten its name to Sauzé. The area surrounding the village is a popular location for British expats, the village featuring an English speaking cafe and many local businesses.

Features
Local features
Sauzé-Vaussais has an old town centre with a clock tower standing outside the town hall (mairie). It has a church with a high vaulted roof, several little bars (one with PMU)and other little shops, such as bakeries. Just outside the town is a supermarket, as well as a dovecote tower (pictured at right) with picnic tables and a water body nearby which is famous throughout the region as the "Plan d'eau de Sauzé".

Nearby features
Sauzé is an hour and a half's drive away from the beaches of La Rochelle and several small touristic islands such as Île-d'Aix, Île de Ré (Isle of Rhé), and the Fouras peninsula; popular summer locations for locals and tourists alike. Not far away, westward of Niort, starts the Poitevin Marsh, a large network of canals and rivers also known as the "Green Venice", for punting or cycling day trips. Also close, is the theme park and science park, the Futuroscope, in Poitiers.

See also
 Communes of the Deux-Sèvres department

References

Communes of Deux-Sèvres